Mary Tomlinson (February 24, 1890 – April 10, 1975), professionally known as Marjorie Main, was an American character actress and singer of the Classical Hollywood period, best known as a Metro-Goldwyn-Mayer contract player in the 1940s and 1950s, and for her role as Ma Kettle in 10 Ma and Pa Kettle movies. Main started her career in vaudeville and theatre, and appeared in film classics, such as Dead End (1937), The Women (1939), Dark Command (1940), The Shepherd of the Hills (1941), Meet Me in St. Louis (1944), and Friendly Persuasion (1956).

Early life
Mary Tomlinson was born on February 24, 1890, near Acton, in rural Marion County, Indiana. She was the second daughter of Reverend Samuel J. Tomlinson, a Disciples of Christ minister, and Jennie L. (McGaughey) Tomlinson. Mary's maternal grandfather, Doctor Samuel McGaughey, was the Acton physician who delivered her.

At the age of three, Tomlinson moved with her family to Indianapolis, Indiana, where her father was pastor of Hillside Christian Church. Four years later, they moved to Goshen and then Elkhart, Indiana. In the early 1900s, the Tomlinson family settled on a farm near Fairland, Indiana.

After attending public schools in Fairland and Shelbyville, Tomlinson spent a year (1905–06) at Franklin College in Franklin, Indiana, where she was a charter member of what became the present-day Delta Delta Delta sorority, before transferring to the Hamilton School of Dramatic Expression in Lexington, Kentucky. She completed a three-year course of study in 1909 at the age of 19. After graduation, Tomlinson took a job as a dramatics instructor at Bourbon College in Paris, Kentucky, but stayed only a year. Tomlinson later claimed that she was fired from the position after asking for a salary increase.

After Tomlinson left Kentucky, she spent the next several years studying dramatic arts in Chicago and New York City, despite her father's disapproval of her career choice. Tomlinson adopted the stage name of Marjorie Main during her early acting career to avoid embarrassing her family.

Marriage
Main married widower Stanley LeFevre Krebs, a psychologist and lecturer, on November 2, 1921. They met while she was performing on the Chautauqua circuit. Main accompanied Krebs on the lecture circuit, handling the details of their life on the road. They had no children together, and made their home in New York City. Main performed with touring companies and in New York theaters on a part-time basis throughout her marriage. She also began her Hollywood film career in 1931. Main considered this period "the happiest years of her life." She returned to a full-time acting career after Krebs died of cancer on September 26, 1935.

The Krebs' marriage was a nontraditional one. By her accounts, the marriage was happy, but not particularly close. Main claimed to be "brokenhearted" following her husband's death, but also explained that his death was "like losing a good friend. Like part of the family." Main's biographer, Michelle Vogel, quotes a later interview in which the actress related: "Dr. Krebs wasn't a very practical man. I didn't figure on having to run the show, I kinda tired of it after a few years. We pretty much went our own ways, but we was [sic] still in the eyes of the law, man and wife."

Vogel also revealed that Main had a long-term relationship with actress Spring Byington.

Career

Early years
Main began her professional career as a performer touring in Chautauqua presentations with a Shakespearean repertory company. After performing for five months in a stock company in Fargo, North Dakota, she began working in vaudeville.

Stage actress
In the mid 1910s, Main appeared in several plays, which included touring in Cheating Cheaters  with John Barrymore in 1916. She also debuted in the Broadway theatre in Yes or No in 1918. In addition, Main returned to vaudeville to perform at the Palace Theater in a skit called The Family Ford with comedian W. C. Fields. Not all of the early plays in which she appeared were a success. A House Divided closed in 1923 after just one performance, but Main continued to find work on the Broadway stage. In 1927, she played Mae West's mother in The Wicked Age, and in 1928, played opposite Barbara Stanwyck in the long-running stage hit Burlesque. Main also appeared in several other Broadway productions: Salvation in 1928, Scarlet Sister Mary in 1930, Ebb Tide in 1931, Music in the Air in 1932, and Jackson White.

One of Main's highest-profile stage performances was in 1935's Dead End as Mrs. Martin, the mother of gangster Baby Face Martin. She played the role in 460 performances before leaving the show in 1936 to play Lucy, a  hotel-keeper/dude-ranch operator, in The Women. Main recreated these two roles in film versions of the plays in 1937 and 1939, respectively.

Film career
One of Main's first feature-film appearances was as an extra in A House Divided (1931). She also appeared in Take A Chance (1933) and Crime Without Passion (1934), and recreated her stage role as a servant in the film version of Music in the Air (also 1934), but most of her performance was cut from the film. Main also made a few more films in Hollywood in the 1930s before returning to the stage in New York City.

Samuel Goldwyn signed Main to reprise her stage role as the mother of a gangster for the film version of Dead End (1937). Humphrey Bogart was cast as her son. She transferred another strong stage performance to film as the dude-ranch operator in The Women (1939).

Main portrayed a diverse set of characters in subsequent films for different studios. These included roles where she was cast as a mother, prison matron, a landlady, aunt, secretary, and a rental agent, among others.

Main was signed to a seven-year Metro-Goldwyn-Mayer (MGM) contract in 1940, after starring with Wallace Beery in Wyoming (1940). She also co-starred in Dark Command (1940) with Walter Pidgeon, and appeared in six major films in 1941.

During World War II, Main used her stage and film notoriety to help promote the sale of war bonds for the U.S. War Department. In December 1942, she returned for a visit to central Indiana, where she helped in the sale of more than $500,000 in war bonds.

In the mid-1940s, in an attempt to repeat the great success Wallace Beery had in teaming with Marie Dressler in the early 1930s, MGM cast Main opposite Beery in six more films, including Barnacle Bill (1941), Jackass Mail (1942), and Bad Bascomb (1946). She also played Sonora Cassidy, the chief cook, in The Harvey Girls (1946).

Main's best-known role was Ma Kettle in the Ma and Pa Kettle film series. She had renewed her contract with MGM for another seven years, which continued until the mid-1950s, when the studio lent her to Universal Pictures to play Ma Kettle for the first time in The Egg and I (1947), starring Claudette Colbert and Fred MacMurray. Main played opposite Percy Kilbride as Pa Kettle and was nominated for an Academy Award for Best Actress in a Supporting Role for her performance in the film.

The two Kettle characters proved to be so popular among film audiences that Universal decided to do a series. Main portrayed the Ma Kettle character in nine Ma and Pa Kettle films between 1949 and 1957. Kilbride was her co-star in most of the films, but left after Ma and Pa Kettle at Waikiki (1955), the seventh in the series. Main filmed The Kettles in the Ozarks (1956) without Kilbride. Parker Fennelly played the Pa Kettle role opposite Main in the final film of the series, The Kettles on Old MacDonald's Farm (1957) Each film grossed Universal about $3 million, which helped save the studio from a financial collapse. In addition to acting in the films, Main wrote some of the dialogue for her character and created her costumes and make-up.

During this time, Main shuttled back and forth between Universal Studios and MGM. She appeared in several MGM musicals during the 1940s and early 1950s, including, Meet Me in St. Louis (1944)  and The Belle of New York (1952). She played Mrs. Wrenley in the studio's all-star film It's a Big Country (1951). Main played her last roles for MGM as Mrs. Hittaway in The Long, Long Trailer (1954) and as Jane Dunstock in Rose Marie (1954). Main portrayed the widow Hudspeth in the hit film Friendly Persuasion (1956). Main's final film appearance was in her best-known role as Ma Kettle in The Kettles on Old MacDonald's  Farm (1957)

Radio and television appearances
On December 15, 1941, she was part of the cast of Norman Corwin's radio program We Hold These Truths. She also performed in The Goldbergs.

In 1958, Main appeared as a rugged frontierswoman Cassie Tanner in the episodes "The Cassie Tanner Story" and "The Sacramento Story" of the television series Wagon Train.

Later years
After her retirement from acting, Main lived a quiet, secluded life in Los Angeles. She became interested in spiritualism and the Moral Re-Armament movement.

Death and legacy
Main died of lung cancer on April 10, 1975, at the age of 85 at St. Vincent's Hospital in Los Angeles, where she had been admitted on April 3. Main is buried in Forest Lawn Memorial Park in Hollywood Hills, California, beside her husband, Doctor Stanley Krebs.

Main, who is best known for playing "raucous, rough, and cantankerous women" on-screen, was characterized as "soft-spoken, shy," and "dignified" when she was off-screen. Main became a popular character actress of the 1940s and 1950s. She appeared in diverse roles on the stage and in more than 80 films, including some that became classics, such as Dead End (1937),  Dark Command (1940), The Shepherd of the Hills (1941), Meet Me in St. Louis (1944), and Friendly Persuasion (1956), but is best known for her Ma Kettle role in the Ma and Pa Kettle film series. The "cornball humor" of the Kettle films endured in television shows, such as The Beverly Hillbillies and Green Acres, of the 1960s.

Theatre performances

Filmography

Film

Television

References

Further reading

External links

 
 
 
 
 Literature on Marjorie Main

1890 births
1975 deaths
Franklin College (Indiana) alumni
Actresses from Indiana
American film actresses
American radio actresses
American stage actresses
American television actresses
Burials at Forest Lawn Memorial Park (Hollywood Hills)
Deaths from lung cancer in California
People from Marion County, Indiana
Vaudeville performers
Metro-Goldwyn-Mayer contract players
Ma and Pa Kettle
20th-century American actresses
People from Franklin, Indiana